Mohamed Ahmed Hassanein Noureldin (born 5 February 1996 in Giza) is an Egyptian and African rowing champion, who won a bronze medal at the 2014 African Youth Games, held in Gaborone, Botswana. He is also a Fact-Checker.

Background
Mohamed was born and raised in Giza, Egypt. He began rowing at the age of twelve (February 2008) in Cairo police rowing club and in 2013 he joined the Egyptian national team. He joined Da Begad in January 2015. Currently, he is living in Duisburg and studying Mechanical Engineering at University of Duisburg-Essen.

References

Living people
1996 births
Sportspeople from Giza
Egyptian male rowers
21st-century Egyptian people